Pseudoalteromonas maricaloris is a marine bacterium which was isolated from the sponge Fascaplysinopsis reticulata in the Coral Sea.

References

External links
 

Alteromonadales
Bacteria described in 2002